The term German Colony can refer to:

 German colonial empire, the former colonies of Germany
 German Colony, Jerusalem a Templer settlement
 German Colony, Haifa a Templer settlement
 Sarona (colony) is the German Templer settlement in Tel Aviv
 American–German Colony a neighborhood in Tel Aviv